Mpongwe District is a district of Zambia, located in Copperbelt Province. The capital lies at Mpongwe. As of the 2010 Zambian Census, the district had a population of 93,380 people.

It neighbours Lufwanyama District and Masaiti District. At one time, before 1997, these three districts were known as 'Ndola Rural'.

References

Districts of Copperbelt Province